Grabowskia is a genus of flowering plants in the nightshade family, Solanaceae.

Selected species
 Grabowskia ameghinoi Speg.
 Grabowskia glauca I.M.Johnst.
 Grabowskia lindleyi Sendtn.
 Grabowskia megalosperma Speg.
 Grabowskia schizocalyx Dammer
 Grabowskia sodiroi Bitter
 Grabowskia spegazzinii Dusén
 Grabowskia duplicata Arn.

References

External links

 
Solanaceae genera
Taxonomy articles created by Polbot